Soulier is a French occupational surname which means "shoemaker", from the Old French soulier meaning "shoe" or "sandal". The name may refer to:

Constant Soulier (1897–1933), French pilot
Fabrice Soulier (born 1969), French poker player
Jean-Pierre Soulier (1755–1812), French musician
Jean Pierre Soulier (1915–2003), French physician
Léon-Raymond Soulier (born 1924), French bishop

See also
Bernard–Soulier syndrome
Shoemaker (surname)

References

French-language surnames